Shubhi Ahuja Dave is an Indian television and film actress, known for her roles as Sanju in Y.A.R.O Ka Tashan and Manisha in Badii Devrani (2015).

Early life and career
Ahuja was born on in Kota, Rajasthan.

In 2011, she made her big-screen debut with Bollywood romantic drama Aashiqui.in directed by Shankhadeep.

Personal life
On 24 November 2015, Shubhi married Aniruddh Dave, an Indian television actor. The couple has a son. They have worked together in Zee TV's Bandhan (2014) and Sony SAB's Y.A.R.O Ka Tashan (2017).

Filmography

Album

References

External links

Year of birth missing (living people)
Living people
21st-century Indian actresses
Indian film actresses
Indian television actresses
Actresses in Hindi cinema
Actresses in Hindi television